Standing in the Dust or Standing in the Mist (romanized: Istadeh Dar Ghobar) is a 2016 biographical drama film about Ahmad Motevaselian, an Iranian commander in the Iran-Iraq war, who disappeared in Lebanon. The film is directed by Mohammad Hossein Mahdavian and produced by Habibollah Valinezhad.

Synopsis 
Ahmad is an army commander who must confront the enemy at the gates of the Khorramshahr, But his fate is determined far from the Iranian border.
The movie depicts the real-life events of this great commander who is regarded as one of Iran's most well-respected contemporary national heroes.

Cast 
 Hadi Hejazifar
 Amir Hossein Hashemi
 Farhad Fadakar
 Emad Mohammadi
 Ebrahim Amini

Awards 
The film won
 Crystal Simorgh for Best Film
 Crystal Simorg for Best Special and Visual Effects
 Crystal Simorg for Best Production and Costume Design
 Special Jury Award for First Film Competition - Best Directing

at the 34th Fajr Film Festival.

References

External links 
 Official Website
 In The Internet Movie Database
 Movie trailer

2016 directorial debut films
2010s Persian-language films
Iranian war films
Iran–Iraq War films
Biographical films about military personnel
Iranian biographical films
Crystal Simorgh for Best Film winners